Prahar or Prahara is a Sanskrit term for a unit of time, or subdivision of the day, approximately three hours long.

Definition
The day is divided into eight parts: four praharas for the day, and four for the night. The first prahara of the day begins at sunrise, and the fourth prahara of the day ends at sunset.  A second round of four praharas unfolds during the night, between sunset and sunrise.

The traditional system of praharas overlaps with the traditional system of muhurtas also, which is based on precise astronomical calculations.

Thus, the day can be regarded as divided into eight praharas (of three hours each) or thirty muhurtas (of 48 minutes each). In both systems, the day commences with sunrise. The timing of the two systems coincides only at sunrise and sunset (four praharas coincide with fifteen muhurtas at the twelve-hour, or 720-minute, point).

History
In the ancient Puranas, the day is divided into eight praharas: four for the day and four for the night. The concept still prevails today in India, particularly in connection with the performance of Indian classical music (see below).

Timing
The first prahara is commonly placed at sunrise, although some sources place it at the brahma-muhurta, a period of time before sunrise (around 4.30  am when Venus can be sighted).

The concept of prahar originated where the lengths of the day and night were based on actual, observable sunrise and sunset. The four praharas of the day start at sunrise, and the four praharas of the night at sunset. If the location is near the equator, where day and night are the same length year round, the praharas of the day and the praharas of the night will be of equal length (three hours each). In other regions, where the relative length of day and night varies according to the season, the praharas of the day will be longer or shorter than the praharas of the night.

Contemporary discussions of prahara often use 7:00 am (the time of sunrise at the equator and at the equinoxes) as a theoretical fixed point of reference for mapping out the praharas at three-hour intervals (7-10, 10-1, etc.). This scheme is a useful pedagogical tool and an efficient way of applying the concept of prahara in a technological "clock" culture. However, it's important to realize that this rigid schema most likely does not capture the original application of prahara. In a traditional, non-technological culture, the length of day and night are based on observable sunrise and sunset. The day, which starts at sunrise and ends at sunset, is divided into four praharas of equal length; and, the night, which starts at sunset and ends at sunrise, is also divided into four equal watches. During the summer, when the days are longer than the nights, the praharas of the day will be longer than the praharas of the night, and vice versa during the winter.

The question of how to handle the praharas when days and nights are unequal in length is critical for timing the performance of ragas, since each raga is ideally performed during a certain prahara.

Indian classical music
Some ragas of the Indian classical music are prescribed to be performed at a particular prahara to maximize their aesthetic effects (see samay). Perhaps the earliest mention of the relation between raga and time is Narada's Sangita Makaranda, written sometime between the 7th and 11th century, which warns musicians against playing ragas at the incorrect time of day. Pandit V.N. Bhatkhande (1860-1936), who formulated the modern system of Indian musical thāt, states that the correct time (or prahara) to play a raga has a relation to its thāt, or scale.

Modern etymology and usage 
The word commonly used in India, Pakistan, Nepal is prahar (Hindi/Nepali प्रहर, Urduپہر), more commonly pronounced  and in West Bengal and Bangladesh is prohor (Bengali প্রহর) in Marathi it is pronounced as Prahar (प्रहर). In Hindi and Urdu the word for "afternoon" is dopahar (= two ). In Bengali the corresponding word is dui-pôhor or more commonly dupur. In Marathi, afternoon is Dupaar with same etymology as in Hindi. It is known as Paar in, Konkani, where First Prahara is known as  Faantya Paar (from Sanskrit, प्रातः प्रहर), and afternoon is known as Donpaar.

References

Time in India
Time in Hinduism